Wesmaldra is a genus of Australian ground spiders that was first described by Norman I. Platnick & Barbara Baehr in 2006. Originally placed with the long-spinneret ground spiders, it was transferred to the ground spiders in 2018.

Species
 it contains fourteen species, found only in the Northern Territory and Western Australia:
Wesmaldra baynesi Platnick & Baehr, 2006 – Australia (Western Australia)
Wesmaldra bidgemia Platnick & Baehr, 2006 (type) – Australia (Western Australia)
Wesmaldra bromilowi Platnick & Baehr, 2006 – Australia (Western Australia)
Wesmaldra hirsti Platnick & Baehr, 2006 – Australia (Western Australia)
Wesmaldra kakadu Platnick & Baehr, 2006 – Australia (Northern Territory)
Wesmaldra learmonth Platnick & Baehr, 2006 – Australia (Western Australia)
Wesmaldra napier Platnick & Baehr, 2006 – Australia (Western Australia)
Wesmaldra nixaut Platnick & Baehr, 2006 – Australia (Western Australia)
Wesmaldra rolfei Platnick & Baehr, 2006 – Australia (Western Australia)
Wesmaldra splendida (Simon, 1908) – Australia (Western Australia)
Wesmaldra talgomine Platnick & Baehr, 2006 – Australia (Western Australia)
Wesmaldra urawa Platnick & Baehr, 2006 – Australia (Western Australia)
Wesmaldra waldockae Platnick & Baehr, 2006 – Australia (Western Australia)
Wesmaldra wiluna Platnick & Baehr, 2006 – Australia (Western Australia)

See also
 List of Gnaphosidae species

References

Araneomorphae genera
Gnaphosidae
Spiders of Australia